Aleksandr Igorevich Nikolayev (born 11 May 1993) is a Russian football player. He also holds Ukrainian citizenship as Oleksandr Ihorovych Nikolayev.

Club career
He made his debut in the Russian Professional Football League for FC Domodedovo Moscow on 2 September 2016 in a game against FC Kolomna.

References

External links
 
 
 Profile by Russian Professional Football League

1993 births
People from Berdiansk
Living people
Ukrainian footballers
Association football goalkeepers
Russian footballers
FC UkrAhroKom Holovkivka players
Ukrainian First League players
Sportspeople from Zaporizhzhia Oblast